The Albanian Women's Cup is the annual cup competition of women's football teams in Albania. It was established only in 2009 and is the second most important event after the Championship. Vllaznia have won the Cup 9 times, with four teams winning the trophy.

List of finals
The list of finals so far:

The 2014/15 final was actually played as a three team round-robin stage. Both Vllaznia and Kukesi won their first match against Kinostudio, making their direct encounter the deciding final match.

The club KS Ada Velipojë disbanded after the 2012/13 season. The whole team and personnel joined KS Vllaznia Shkodër where they established a new women's team.

By titles

See also
Albanian Cup, men's cup

References

External links
Website
Cup at albaniansport.net
Albania - List of Women Cup Finals at RSSSF

Women's national association football cups
Women
Recurring sporting events established in 2010
Cup